The Federal Service for Environmental, Technological and Nuclear Supervision (Rostekhnadzor) is the supervisory body of the Government of Russia on ecological, technological, and nuclear issues. Its functions include the passage of regulatory legal acts, supervision and oversight in the field of environmental protection, limiting harmful technogenic impact (including the handling of industrial and consumer waste), safety when working with the subsoil (e.g., mining), protection of the subsoil, industrial safety, atomic energy safety (not including the development, preparation, testing, operation and use of nuclear weapons and military atomic facilities), the safety of electrical and thermal facilities and networks (except for household facilities and networks), the safety of hydraulic structures at industrial and energy sites; the safety of manufacturing, storage, and use of industrial explosives, and special state security functions in these areas.

Russian Government Resolution № 404 of 29 May 2008 transferred Rostekhnadzor to the Ministry of Natural Resources and the Environment; previously, the service had been directly subordinate to the government. However, this was reversed by President Dmitry Medvedev on 23 June 2010, when he brought it back under the direct control of the government. 
In accordance with RF Government Resolution No. 54 of 1 February 2006, Rostekhnadzor was entrusted with oversight of the construction industry.

History
Rostekhnadzor was created in 2004, in a merger of the Federal Atomic Oversight Service and the Federal Technological Oversight Service. Environmental oversight functions were transferred to it after the Federal Environmental and Natural Resource Oversight Service was transformed into the Federal Natural Resources Oversight Service. The combined structure was initially headed by the former director of Federal Atomic Oversight, Andrey Malyshev, who was acting director of the new service for 18 months.

The current head of Rostekhnadzor is Aleksandr Trembitsky.

Structure
Since September 2009, Rostekhnadzor has consisted of a headquarters, 23 regional departments for industrial and environmental supervision in federal districts, 7 interregional departments for nuclear and radiation safety, and 4 technical support organizations. In turn, the Headquarters has 16 departments organized by function.

Service heads
Andrey Malyshev (acting) — (2004—2005)
Konstantin Pulikovsky — (2005—2008)
 — (2008—2013)
Aleksey Ferapontov (acting) — (2013—2014)
 — (13 January 2014 — 30 March 2021)
Aleksandr Trembitsky — (since 30 March 2021)

References

Rostechnadzor Order No. 777 dated 26.12.2012 Rostechnadzor Order No. 777 dated 26.12.2012 of the Federal Service for Environmental, Technological and Nuclear Supervision 'On approval of safety guidelines for oil stores and petroleum stores'
Rostechnadzor Order No. 778 dated 26.12.2012 Rostechnadzor Order No. 778 dated 26.12.2012 of the Federal Service for Environmental, Technological and Nuclear Supervision about approval of Federal norms and regulations in the field of industrial safety 'Safety guidelines for storages of pressurized liquefied hydrocarbon gases and highly inflammable liquids'
Rostechnadzor Order No. 125 dated 29.03.2016 Rostechnadzor Order No. 125 dated 29.03.2016 of the Federal Service for Environmental, Technological and Nuclear Supervision about approval of Federal norms and regulations in the field of industrial safety 'Safety rules for oil refinery and gas processing facilities'
Rostechnadzor Order No. 521 dated 11.12.2020 Federal Service for Environmental, Technological and Nuclear Supervision (Rostechnadzor) Order No. 521 dated 11.12.2020 On approval of Federal norms and regulations in the field of industrial safety 'Safety regulations for liquefied natural gas facilities'
Rostechnadzor Order No. 529 dated 15.12.2020 Federal Service for Environmental, Technological and Nuclear Supervision (Rostechnadzor) Order No. 529 dated 15.12.2020 On approval of Federal norms and regulations in the field of industrial safety 'Industrial safety requirements for petroleum and petroleum products storage facilities'
Rostechnadzor Order No. 531 dated 15.12.2020 Federal Service for Environmental, Technological and Nuclear Supervision (Rostechnadzor) Order No. 531 dated 15.12.2020 On approval of Federal norms and regulations in the field of industrial safety 'Safety rules for gas distribution and gas consumption networks'
Rostechnadzor Order No. 533 dated 15.12.2020 Federal Service for Environmental, Technological and Nuclear Supervision (Rostechnadzor) Order No. 533 dated 15.12.2020 On approval of Federal norms and regulations in the field of industrial safety 'General rules on explosion protection for explosive and fire hazardous chemical, petrochemical plants and oil refineries'
Rostechnadzor Order No. 536 dated 15.12.2020 Federal Service for Environmental, Technological and Nuclear Supervision (Rostechnadzor) Order No. 536 dated 15.12.2020 On approval of Federal norms and regulations in the field of industrial safety 'Rules of industrial safety of equipment operating under gauge pressure' 
Rostechnadzor Order No. 500 dated 07.12.2020 Federal Service for Environmental, Technological and Nuclear Supervision (Rostechnadzor) Order No. 500 dated 07.12.2020 On approval of Federal norms and regulations in the field of industrial safety 'Safety rules of chemically hazardous production facilities'

External links
 Official website 
 Official website 
 Official Translations of Federal norms and regulations in the field of industrial safety, FNiP, Rostechnadzor orders into English
 Official Translations of Rostechnadzor orders into English 
 Официальные перевод Приказов Ростехнадзора на английский язык 

Government agencies of Russia
Nuclear industry organizations
2004 establishments in Russia
Environment of Russia